The 2015–16 season was the 117th season of competitive league football in the history of English football club Wolverhampton Wanderers. The club are competing in the second tier of the English football system, the Football League Championship for a second consecutive year having finished 7th in the previous season following their promotion from League One.

The club ended the campaign in 14th position, one of their lowest finishes during the previous 25 years, having failed to compete for the play-offs. The season saw owner Steve Morgan resign as chairman and place the club up for sale but no sale has to date been concluded. Supporter unrest was strengthened further when Benik Afobe, who ended as the team's leading goalscorer, was sold during the January transfer window to Premier League Bournemouth.

Competitions

Pre-season

Football League Championship

A total of 24 teams competed in the Football League Championship in the 2015–16 season. Each team played every other team twice, once at their stadium, and once at the opposition's. Three points were awarded to teams for each win, one point per draw, and none for defeats.

The provisional fixture list was released on 17 June 2015, but was subject to change in the event of matches being selected for television coverage or police concerns.

Results summary

Results by round

League table

FA Cup

League Cup

Players

Statistics

|-
|align="left"|||align="left"|||align="left"| 
|||0||||0||||0||||0||0||0||
|-
|align="left"|||align="left"|||align="left"| 
|||2||||0||3||0||||2||1||0||
|-
|align="left"|||align="left"|||align="left"|  †
|||0||0||0||1||0||||0||0||0||
|-
|align="left"|||align="left"|||style="background:#faecc8; text-align:left;"|  ‡
|||0||0||0||0||0||style="background:#98FB98"|||0||0||0||
|-
|align="left"|||align="left"|||align="left"| 
|||5||||0||0||0||||5||1||0||
|-
|align="left"|||align="left"|||align="left"|  †
|||0||0||0||0||0||||0||0||0||
|-
|align="left"|||align="left"|||style="background:#faecc8; text-align:left;"|  ‡
|||0||0||0||0||0||style="background:#98FB98"|||0||0||0||
|-
|align="left"|||align="left"|||align="left"| 
|||2||||0||0||0||||2||2||0||
|-
|align="left"|||align="left"|||align="left"| 
|||7||||0||||0||||7||2||0||
|-
|align="left"|||align="left"|||align="left"|  ¤ 
|||5||0||0||||0||||5||6||0||
|-
|align="left"|||align="left"|FW||align="left"| 
|||0||0||0||1||1||||1||0||0||
|-
|align="left"|10||align="left"|FW||align="left"|  †
|||9||0||0||||1||||10||1||0||
|-
|align="left"|10||align="left"|FW||align="left"| 
|||3||0||0||0||0||style="background:#98FB98"|||3||0||0||
|-
|align="left"|11||align="left"|||align="left"| 
|||3||||0||1||0||||3||9||0||
|-
|align="left"|12||align="left"|||align="left"|  ¤
|||0||0||0||2||0||style="background:#98FB98"|||0||0||0||
|-
|align="left"|13||align="left"|||align="left"|  ¤
|0||0||0||0||0||0||0||0||0||0||
|-
|align="left"|14||align="left"|||align="left"|  ¤
|0||0||0||0||0||0||0||0||0||0||
|-
|align="left"|15||align="left"|||align="left"|  ¤
|||0||0||0||||0||||0||0||0||
|-
|align="left"|16||align="left"|||align="left"| 
|||0||||0||1||0||style="background:#98FB98"|||0||5||1||
|-
|align="left"|17||align="left"|||align="left"|  ¤
|||0||||0||||0||||0||1||0||
|-
|align="left"|18||align="left"|||align="left"| 
|||0||||0||||0||||0||10||0||
|-
|align="left"|19||align="left"|||align="left"| 
|||1||0||0||3||0||||1||3||0||
|-
|align="left"|20||align="left"|||style="background:#faecc8; text-align:left;"|  ‡
|||2||0||0||2||1||style="background:#98FB98"|||3||4||0||
|-
|align="left"|22||align="left"|||align="left"| 
|||0||||0||0||0||||0||1||0||
|-
|align="left"|23||align="left"|||align="left"| 
|||1||||0||3||0||||1||2||0||
|-
|align="left"|24||align="left"|||align="left"|  ¤
|||1||||0||0||0||style="background:#98FB98"|||1||0||0||
|-
|align="left"|25||align="left"|||align="left"| 
|||2||0||0||0||0||style="background:#98FB98"|||2||0||0
|-
|align="left"|26||align="left"|||style="background:#faecc8; text-align:left;"|  ‡
|||0||0||0||2||0||style="background:#98FB98"|15||0||0||0||
|-
|align="left"|27||align="left"|FW||style="background:#faecc8; text-align:left;"|  ‡
|||0||0||0||0||0||style="background:#98FB98"|||0||0||0||
|-
|align="left"|27||align="left"|FW||align="left"| 
|||3||||0||0||0||style="background:#98FB98"|||3||0||0||
|-
|align="left"|28||align="left"|||align="left"| 
|||0||0||0||2||0||style="background:#98FB98"|||0||0||0||
|-
|align="left"|29||align="left"|FW||style="background:#faecc8; text-align:left;"|  ‡
|||3||||0||||0||style="background:#98FB98"|||3||2||0||
|-
|align="left"|30||align="left"|||align="left"| 
|||0||0||0||||0||||0||1||0||
|-
|align="left"|31||align="left"|||align="left"| 
|0||0||0||0||0||0||0||0||0||0||
|-
|align="left"|33||align="left"|FW||align="left"| 
|0||0||0||0||0||0||0||0||0||0||
|-
|align="left"|35||align="left"|||align="left"| 
|||0||0||0||0||0||style="background:#98FB98"|||0||0||0||
|-
|align="left"|39||align="left"|FW||align="left"| 
|0||0||0||0||0||0||0||0||0||0||
|-
|align="left"|43||align="left"|||align="left"| 
|0||0||0||0||0||0||0||0||0||0||
|-
|align="left"|48||align="left"|FW||align="left"| 
|||0||0||0||||1||style="background:#98FB98"|||1||2||0||
|-
|align="left"|50||align="left"|||align="left"| 
|0||0||0||0||0||0||0||0||0||0||
|}

Awards

Transfers

Transfers in

Loans in

Transfers out

Loans out

References

Wolverhampton Wanderers
Wolverhampton Wanderers F.C. seasons